This was the first edition of the tournament.

Jesika Malečková and Isabella Shinikova won the title, defeating Veronika Erjavec and Weronika Falkowska in the final, 7–6(7–5), 6–3.

Seeds

Draw

Draw

References
Main Draw

Brasov Open - Doubles